G. S. Sachdev (born Gurbachan Singh Sachdev, in Lyallpur, Punjab, 1935 – June 24, 2018) was an Indian performer of the bansuri (bamboo flute).  He performed Hindustani classical music.

Sachdev was on the advisory board of the World Flute Society.

Among his students were Oscar van Dillen, Jeff Whitter and Jin Hi Kim.

Discography
Spirit
Live in Concert
Flights of Improvisation
Full Moon
Master of the Bamboo Flute, v. 2
Bansuri (Solo)
Classical North Indian Ragas
Two Moods
Romantic Ragas
Live in New York
Lyrical Grace
Amar Sangit
Jasmine Nights
Incantations
Aradhana
Greeting of the Dawn
Raga Patdeep (cassette)

See also
Bansuri
Hindustani classical music

External links
G. S. Sachdev official site

1935 births
2018 deaths
Hindustani instrumentalists
Indian flautists
People from Faisalabad